The 1941 Georgetown Hoyas football team was an American football team that represented Georgetown University as an independent during the 1941 college football season. In its 10th year under head coach Jack Hagerty, the team compiled a 5–4 and outscored opponents by a total of 114 to 61. Georgetown played its home games at Griffith Stadium in Washington, D.C.

Tackle Al Blozis was selected by the Associated Press as a first-team player on the 1941 All-Eastern football team. Blozis was later inducted into the College Football Hall of Fame.

Schedule

References

Georgetown
Georgetown Hoyas football seasons
Georgetown Hoyas football